The thief's knot  resembles the reef knot (square knot) except that the free, or bitter ends are on opposite sides.  It is said that sailors would secure their belongings in a ditty bag using the thief knot, often with the ends hidden. If another sailor went through the bag, the odds were high the thief would tie the bag back using the more common reef knot, revealing the tampering, hence the name.  It is difficult to tie by mistake, unlike the granny knot, unless one attempts to tie a square knot in a similar manner to a sheet bend (which is the correct way to tie a thief knot), then it is possible to tie accidentally.

The thief knot is much less secure than the already insecure reef knot. It unties itself if the lines are pulled when the same action would seize a reef knot.

Tying

Related knots

See also
List of binding knots
List of knots

Sources

External links
 The Reef Knot Family